The 2010 season was the New Orleans Saints' 44th in the National Football League (NFL) and their 35th playing home games in the Louisiana Superdome. From 2009, the Saints were coming off their first Super Bowl-winning season and the most successful in franchise history, having begun undefeated for 13 consecutive games only to lose their three final regular season encounters to finish 13–3. The Saints also attempted to win the NFC South Division title for the third time in history, earn their first consecutive postseason berths since 1991, and successfully defend their conference and league championships. The Saints failed to improve on their 13–3 record, finishing 11–5 and qualifying for the playoffs as a wild card team. The Saints were eliminated in the first round by the Seattle Seahawks, who were the first team with a losing record (7–9) to qualify for the playoffs and/or win a division title in a full season. Sean Payton served his fifth year as head coach.

Offseason

2010 NFL Draft

As the winners of Super Bowl XLIV, the Saints acquired the 32nd pick in the first round and drafted in this order.

Roster signings
All signings were to active roster, except where otherwise noted.

Roster releases

Schedule

Preseason

Regular season

Standings

Preseason results

Preseason Week 1: at New England Patriots

Preseason Week 2: vs Houston Texans

Preseason Week 3: vs San Diego Chargers

Preseason Week 4: at Tennessee Titans

Regular season results

Week 1: vs. Minnesota Vikings
NFL Kickoff game

With their Super Bowl title to defend, the Saints began their season at home in the annual Kickoff Game against the Minnesota Vikings, in a rematch of last season's NFC Championship Game. New Orleans would strike first in the opening quarter with quarterback Drew Brees hooking up with wide receiver Devery Henderson on a 29-yard touchdown pass. The Vikings would take the lead in the second quarter as kicker Ryan Longwell made a 41-yard field goal, followed by quarterback Brett Favre's 20-yard touchdown pass to tight end Visanthe Shiancoe (with a blocked PAT).

In the third quarter, the Saints would regain the lead with a 1-yard touchdown run from running back Pierre Thomas. From there, New Orleans' defense would prevent any further progress from Minnesota.

With the win, New Orleans began their season at 1–0.

Week 2: at San Francisco 49ers

Coming off their home win over the Vikings, the Saints flew to Candlestick Park for a Week 2 Monday Night duel with the San Francisco 49ers. New Orleans would deliver the opening punch in the first quarter as 49ers center David Baas' high snap deep within San Francisco territory went out of the back of the endzone for a safety. The Saints would add onto their lead as quarterback Drew Brees hooked up with running back Reggie Bush on a 6-yard touchdown pass. The 49ers would answer in the second quarter as quarterback Alex Smith found running back Frank Gore on a 12-yard touchdown pass.

San Francisco would take the lead with running back Anthony Dixon's 2-yard touchdown run, yet New Orleans would respond with Brees' 3-yard touchdown pass to tight end David Thomas. The Saints would add onto their lead in the fourth quarter as kicker Garrett Hartley made a 46-yard and a 19-yard field goal. The 49ers would strike back as Gore got a 7-yard touchdown run, followed by Smith's 2-point conversion pass to tight end Vernon Davis. In the end, New Orleans got the last laugh as Hartley booted the game-ending 37-yard field goal.

With the win, the Saints improved to 2–0.

Week 3: vs. Atlanta Falcons

Hoping to increase their winning streak the Saints played inside their dome for an NFC South rivalry match against the Falcons. The Saints took the early lead when QB Drew Brees made a 2-yard TD pass to TE Jeremy Shockey. The Falcons replied with QB Matt Ryan making a 13-yard TD pass to TE Tony Gonzalez. The Saints re-took the lead with Brees finding WR Lance Moore on an 80-yard TD pass. But the Falcons replied in the second quarter with RB Michael Turner making a 1-yard TD run. The Saints trailed for the first time in the game when kicker Matt Bryant made a 23-yard field goal. But they took the lead with Brees finding Moore again on a 16-yard TD pass. The Falcons would score when Ryan made a 22-yard TD pass to WR Roddy White. The Saints would tie the game with kicker Garrett Hartley making a 32-yard field goal. At overtime, the decision was made when Matt Bryant hit a 46-yard field goal to give the Saints their first loss of the season, bringing their record down to 2–1.

Week 4: vs. Carolina Panthers

The Saints fourth game was inside their dome for an NFC south rivalry match against the Panthers. In the 1st quarter New Orleans took the lead as QB Drew Brees completed a 4-yard TD pass to WR Lance Moore. Carolina replied with QB Jimmy Clausen making a 55-yard TD pass to RB Jonathan Stewart. The Saints took the lead when kicker John Carney nailed a 32-yard field goal, but fell behind when RB DeAngelo Williams made a 39-yard TD run. Then John Carney made two field goals to give the Saints the win. He made a 32-yard field goal in the 3rd quarter and a 25-yard field goal in the 4th.

With the win, the Saints improved to 3–1.

Week 5: at Arizona Cardinals

Coming off their close win over the Panthers the Saints flew to University of Phoenix Stadium for an NFC duel with the Cardinals. In the first quarter the Saints took the early lead as kicker John Carney nailed a 31-yard field goal, followed by QB Drew Brees completing a 1-yard TD pass to TE Jeremy Shockey. The Cardinals replied with kicker Jay Feely making a 37-yard field goal, followed by OT Levi Brown recovering a fumble and returning it 2 yards for a touchdown. In the third quarter the Saints fell behind when Feely got a 44-yard field goal, followed the 4th quarter by Feely's 29-yard field goal. Then FS Kerry Rhodes recovered a fumble and ran 27 yards to the end zone for a touchdown. Then the Saints replied with Brees making a 35-yard TD pass to WR Robert Meachem, but had more problems when Brees' pass was intercepted by CB Dominique Rodgers-Cromartie and returned 28 yards to the end zone for a touchdown.

With the loss, the Saints fell to 3–2.

Week 6: at Tampa Bay Buccaneers

Hoping to rebound from their loss to the Cardinals the Saints flew to Raymond James Stadium for an NFC South rivalry match against the Buccaneers. In the first quarter New Orleans took the lead when QB Drew Brees completed a 41-yard TD pass to WR Lance Moore. Followed in the second quarter by Brees making a 42-yard TD pass to WR Robert Meachem. This was followed by kicker Garrett Hartley nailing a 27-yard field goal. The Saints increased their lead when QB Drew Brees made a 4-yard TD pass to FB Heath Evans. Tampa Bay scored in the fourth quarter with QB Josh Freeman making a 2-yard TD pass to WR Micheal Spurlock (With a failed 2-point conversion), but the Saints pulled away as RB Ladell Betts got a 1-yard TD run.

With the win, the Saints improve to 4–2.

Week 7: vs. Cleveland Browns

With the loss, the Saints fell to 4–3.

Week 8: vs. Pittsburgh Steelers

Hoping to rebound from their home loss to the Browns, the Saints stayed home for a Week 8 interconference duel with the Pittsburgh Steelers on Sunday night. After a scoreless first quarter, New Orleans trailed in the second quarter as Steelers kicker Jeff Reed got a 19-yard field goal. The Saints would answer with a 31-yard field goal from kicker Garrett Hartley.

New Orleans took the lead in the third quarter as Hartley booted a 23-yard field goal. In the fourth quarter, the Saints increased their lead as quarterback Drew Brees found wide receiver Marques Colston on a 16-yard touchdown pass. Pittsburgh responded with running back Rashard Mendenhall getting a 38-yard touchdown run, yet New Orleans came right back as Brees connected with wide receiver Lance Moore on an 8-yard touchdown pass.

With the win, the Saints improved to 5–3.

Week 9: at Carolina Panthers

Coming off their win over the Steelers the Saints flew to Bank of America Stadium for an NFC South rivalry match against the Panthers. In the first quarter the Saints trailed early after kicker John Kasay made a 20-yard field goal. Then they made a large scoring run to dominate the game after QB Drew Brees completed a 7-yard TD pass to TE Jeremy Shockey. Followed by Brees finding TE Jimmy Graham on a 19-yard TD pass. The lead was extended by kicker Garrett Hartley as he nailed a 31 and a 36-yard field goal. The Saints increased their lead with CB Jabari Greer returning an interception 24 yards for a touchdown. This was followed by RB Ladell Betts getting a 1-yard TD run.

With the win, the Saints headed into their bye week at 6–3 and swept the Panthers for the first time since 2001.

Week 10: BYE

Week 11: vs. Seattle Seahawks

Coming off their bye week the Saints played inside their dome for an NFC duel with the Seahawks. In the first quarter the Saints trailed early as kicker Olindo Mare hit a 20-yard field goal; but they pulled ahead after RB Chris Ivory got a 1-yard TD run. The lead narrowed in the 2nd quarter by Mare getting a 43-yard field goal. The Saints increased it when QB Drew Brees made a 23 and a 3-yard TD pass to WR Marques Colston and WR Robert Meachem. The lead was narrowed again after QB Matt Hasselbeck got a 2-yard TD pass to WR Ben Obomanu; but the Saints replied with Brees throwing a 22-yard TD pass to Colston. The lead narrowed again with Mare hitting a 43-yard field goal. The lead extended in the third quarter with Brees finding Meachem again on a 32-yard TD pass. The Seahawks made the only score of the fourth quarter with Mare making a 20-yard field goal.

With the win, the Saints improved to 7–3.

Week 12: at Dallas Cowboys
Thanksgiving Day game

The Saints played the Thanksgiving Day game at Cowboys Stadium for an NFC duel against the Cowboys. The Saints commanded the first quarter with RB Chris Ivory getting a 3-yard TD run, followed by kicker Garrett Hartley getting a 50-yard field goal, and then by Ivory making a 6-yard TD run. The lead was narrowed as kicker David Buehler got a 21-yard field goal, but the Saints replied as Hartley nailed a 45-yard field goal. The lead was narrowed again as Buehler hit a 53-yard field goal, followed by Miles Austin getting a 60-yard TD run. The Saints scored with Hartley making a 28-yard field goal, but fell behind with Marion Barber and Tashard Choice getting a 1-yard TD run. The Saints, down 27–23, were well on their way to defeat when John Kitna hit Austin with a long-gainer, but safety Malcolm Jenkins stripped Roy Williams and recovered at the New Orleans 11, enabling the Saints to pull out the win five plays later, with QB Drew Brees completing a 12-yard TD pass to WR Lance Moore, completing an 89-yard drive.

With the win, the Saints improved to 8–3.

Week 13: at Cincinnati Bengals

Coming off their win over the Cowboys the Saints played an interconference duel with the Bengals at Paul Brown Stadium. In the first quarter, the Saints took the early lead as kicker Garrett Hartley nailed a 48-yard field goal. The Bengals replied with kicker Clint Stitser hitting a 29-yard field goal, but the Saints scored again with RB Chris Ivory getting a 55-yard TD run, with the Bengals responding as Stitser made a 23-yard field goal. The Saints increased their lead as Hartley made a 24-yard field goal, followed by Ivory getting a 1-yard TD run. The lead was broken down as QB Carson Palmer made a 5-yard TD pass to WR Terrell Owens (With a failed PAT as the kick went wide right), followed by RB Cedric Benson getting a 1-yard TD run. The Saints responded as QB Drew Brees completed a 52-yard TD pass to WR Robert Meachem, but fell behind with Benson getting a 4-yard TD run (With a successful 2-point conversion as Palmer passed to TE Jermaine Gresham), followed by Stitser making a 47-yard field goal. Still, they managed to score to take the win as Brees threw a 3-yard TD pass to WR Marques Colston.

With the win, the Saints improved to 9–3.

Week 14: vs. St. Louis Rams

With the win, the Saints improved to 10–3.

Week 15: at Baltimore Ravens

With the loss, the Saints fell to 10–4.

Week 16: at Atlanta Falcons

Looking to clinch a playoff berth and avenge their Week 3 loss against the Falcons, the Saints traveled to Atlanta for a Monday Night rematch. New Orleans would score first with Garrett Hartley kicking a FG from 52 yards late in the first quarter. RB Pierre Thomas would add to the Saints' lead with a 2-yard TD run; however, Atlanta would respond with a Matt Ryan 7-yard TD pass to Roddy White to cut the lead to three. After a scoreless third quarter, the Falcons took the lead with Chauncey Davis returning an interception 26 yards for a touchdown. New Orleans reclaimed the lead late in the 4th with a Drew Brees 6-yard TD pass to Jimmy Graham. Atlanta attempted to come back; however, New Orleans held on for the win.

With the win, the Saints improved to 11–4 and clinched a playoff berth, becoming the first team in the NFC South to earn consecutive playoff appearances.

Week 17: vs. Tampa Bay Buccaneers

The Saints' sixteenth game was an NFC South rivalry rematch against the Buccaneers inside their dome. In the first quarter the Saints trailed early as kicker Connor Barth hit a 43-yard field goal, but took the lead with QB Drew Brees throwing a 4-yard TD pass to TE Jimmy Graham. The Buccaneers replied with QB Josh Freeman completing a 2-yard TD pass to WR Dezmon Briscoe, but the Saints tied the game with kicker Garrett Hartley nailing a 45-yard field goal. However, they fell behind again with Barth hitting a 32-yard field goal, followed by Freeman making an 18-yard TD pass to WR Mike Williams. The Saints tried to narrow the gap with Hartley making a 38-yard field goal, but the Buccaneers pulled away with Barth nailing a 48-yard field goal.

With the loss, the Saints finish their regular season on an 11–5 record.

Postseason results

NFC Wild Card playoffs: at Seattle Seahawks

Entering the postseason as the NFC's #5 seed, the Saints began their playoff run at Qwest Field for the NFC Wild Card Round against the #4 Seattle Seahawks in a rematch of their Week 11 duel. The Seahawks entered the playoffs as the only team to ever make the playoffs with a losing record, theirs being 7–9. New Orleans delivered the game's opening strike in the first quarter with a 26-yard field goal from kicker Garrett Hartley, followed by quarterback Drew Brees finding fullback Heath Evans on a 1-yard touchdown pass. The Seahawks would answer with quarterback Matt Hasselbeck completing an 11-yard touchdown pass to tight end John Carlson. The Saints struck back in the second quarter with a 5-yard touchdown run from running back Julius Jones, but Seattle took the lead with Hasselbeck's 7-yard touchdown pass to Carlson, kicker Olindo Mare making a 29-yard field goal, and Hasselbeck completing a 45-yard touchdown pass to wide receiver Brandon Stokley. New Orleans would close out the half with Hartley's 22-yard field goal.

The Seahawks continued to hack away in the third quarter as Hasselbeck threw a 38-yard touchdown pass to wide receiver Mike Williams, followed by Mare's 39-yard field goal. The Saints tried to rally in the fourth quarter as Jones got a 4-yard touchdown run, followed by Hartley's 21-yard field goal, but Seattle delivered a punishing blow as running back Marshawn Lynch got a 67-yard touchdown run. New Orleans tried to catch up with Brees connecting with wide receiver Devery Henderson (with a failed two-point conversion), but a failed onside kick sealed any hope of a comeback.

With the loss, the Saints, with an overall record of 11–6, were dethroned as Super Bowl champions. This was the sixth consecutive year the defending world champions failed to repeat their title.

Personnel

Coaching staff

Final roster

References

External links
 2010 New Orleans Saints at Pro-Football-Reference.com

New Orleans
New Orleans Saints seasons
New